Gordon "Gord" Hinse (born August 24, 1987) is a professional Canadian football offensive lineman. He last played for the Saskatchewan Roughriders of the Canadian Football League. He was drafted by the Edmonton Eskimos in the second round of the 2009 CFL Draft and signed a four-year deal with an option in 2013. He played CIS football for the Alberta Golden Bears - the University of Alberta team where he was named a Canada West all-star and Academic All-Canadian.

Professional career

2009 Season
After eight backup selections, he was placed on the practice roster, ending up on the nine-game injured list before the end of the season.

2010 Season
He was in the Eskimos' squad 18 times during the season, playing in a number of short yardage plays.  During this season he has returned to the Alberta Golden Bears to help with the coaching.

2011 Season
Gord Hinse began the 2011 season on the 9-game injured list with an injury to the thumb. He saw action when starting centres Aaron Fiacconi and Kyle Koch went out with injuries. Hinse was activated for the October 10, 2011 game against the Saskatchewan Roughriders and played centre midway through the game after Kyle Koch was injured.  He played centre for the last 5 games (4 starts) of the 2011 season.  Hinse also started the Western Semi-Final and the Western Final.

During an October 29, 2011 game against the BC Lions, Hinse became well known for his continued play in blocking for Ricky Ray despite having lost his helmet at the beginning of the play.

Personal Achievements
On June 11, 2012, Hinse graduated with a Bachelor of Arts degree from the University of Alberta Faculty of Native Studies.

References

External links
Saskatchewan Roughriders bio 
Winnipeg Blue Bombers bio 
Edmonton Eskimos player bio

1987 births
Living people
Alberta Golden Bears football players
Canadian football offensive linemen
Edmonton Elks players
Winnipeg Blue Bombers players
Saskatchewan Roughriders players
Players of Canadian football from Alberta
Canadian football people from Edmonton